Tennis were contested at the 1990 Asian Games in Beijing International Tennis Center, Beijing, China from September 24 to October 5, 1990.

Tennis had team, doubles, and singles events for both men and women, as well as a mixed doubles competition, a total of seven events.

Medalists

Medal table

See also
 Tennis at the Asian Games

References
New Straits Times, October 3–14, 1990

External links
Olympic Council of Asia

 
1990 Asian Games
1990 Asian Games events
Asian Games
1990